Hiram na Alaala (International title: Memories of Love / ) is a Philippine television drama romance series broadcast by GMA Network. Directed by Dominic Zapata, it stars Dennis Trillo, Kris Bernal, Lauren Young and Rocco Nacino. It premiered on September 22, 2014 on the network's Telebabad line up replacing Ang Dalawang Mrs. Real. The series concluded on January 9, 2015 with a total of 80 episodes. It was replaced by Second Chances in its timeslot.

Cast and characters

Lead cast
 Dennis Trillo as Ivan Legazpi
 Kris Bernal as Andrea "Andeng" Dizon-Legazpi
 Lauren Young as Bethany Sandoval-Alcantara
 Rocco Nacino as Joseph "Otep" Corpuz

Supporting cast
 Jackie Lou Blanco as Regina Legazpi
 Allan Paule as Alexander "Xander" Dizon
 Lotlot de Leon as Annabelle Sta. Cruz-Dizon
 Nina Ricci Alagao as Martina Sandoval
 Shyr Valdez as Araceli Corpuz
 Dexter Doria as Yolanda "Ola" Dizon
 Antonio Aquitania as Benedict Corpuz
 Julia Lee as Gelai
 Kenneth Paul Cruz as Christian "Chris" Corpuz
 Jenny Rose as Krissy Corpuz
 Rap Fernandez as Bruno

Guest cast
 Hershey Garcia as young Andeng
 Carl Acosta as young Ivan
 Timothy Chan as young Otep
 Kiel Rodriguez as Rod
 Sheena Halili as Yasmin Perez-Corpuz
 Benjamin Alves as Kevin Luna
 Bettina Carlos
 Mike Tan
 Edwin Reyes
 Rez Cortez
 Madelaine Nicolas

Ratings
According to AGB Nielsen Philippines' Mega Manila household television ratings, the pilot episode of Hiram na Alaala earned a 19.8% rating. While the final episode scored a 20.2% rating. The series had its highest rating on November 13, 2014 with a 21.8% rating.

References

External links
 
 

2014 Philippine television series debuts
2015 Philippine television series endings
Filipino-language television shows
GMA Network drama series
Philippine romance television series
Television shows set in Quezon City